"The Catbird Seat" is a 1942 short story by James Thurber. The story first appeared in The New Yorker on November 14, 1942. The story was also published in the 1945 anthology The Thurber Carnival.

Synopsis
The protagonist is Mr. Martin, a precise, dedicated, vice-free employee of F&S whose habits were once publicly praised by Mr. Fitweiler, "The F at F&S." Martin is being bullied by Mrs. Ulgine Barrows, an unruly, opportunistic Brooklyn Dodgers fan and user of slang (e.g. "tearing up the pea patch"). 

Ultimately, Barrows wants to re-organize Martin's precious filing department. At first, Martin cannot bear the changes and copes by plotting a way to "rub out" Mrs. Barrows; ultimately, he decides instead to make it seem like she has lost her mind.

Analysis
The story explores and exploits the myth of the submissive man at the mercy of the dominating woman.

Popular culture
The Oxford English Dictionary attributes the first recorded usage of the phrase catbird seat to this story. Mrs. Barrows likes to use the phrase. Another character, Joey Hart, explains that Mrs. Barrows must have picked up the expression from the baseball broadcaster Red Barber and that to Barber, "sitting in the catbird seat" meant "'sitting pretty,' like a batter with three balls and no strikes on him."

Film adaptation
The 1960 movie The Battle of the Sexes is based on the short story.

See also
Literary fiction

References

External links
The original short story from The New Yorker

1942 short stories
Works by James Thurber
Works originally published in The New Yorker
Short stories adapted into films
Works about photojournalism